Jeux sans frontières ("Games Without Borders" in French) is a Europe-wide television game show, based on the French programme Intervilles which was first broadcast in 1962. In was broadcast from 1965 to 1999 under the auspices of the European Broadcasting Union (EBU), which owned the format.

In non French-speaking countries, the show had alternative titles. It is also widely known as It's a Knockout, the title of the BBC's domestic version and national selection for the programme.

History
The idea of the show came from French President Charles de Gaulle, whose wish was that French and German youth would meet in a series of games to reinforce the friendship between France and Germany. In 1965, Guy Lux and Claude Savarit spread this idea to other European countries. Teams representing France, West Germany, Belgium, and Italy took part in the first edition of the show called Inter Nations Games.

At the height of its popularity, the show was watched by 110 million viewers across Europe. The original series run ended in 1982. It was revived in 1988 with a different complexion of nations and in its latest editions was hosted by smaller broadcasters, with the notable exception of Italy's RAI, which hosted three editions with a fixed location in 1996, 1998 and 1999.

Format
In its original conception, teams from Belgium, France, West Germany and Italy competed each week in head-to-head competition between two cities/towns from two of the four competing nations. There would be sports events, but also studio based quizzes each week. Eventually, all teams will have competed against each other and the team with the highest cumulative points for each nation from the series would meet in two semi-finals, with the two winners meeting in the final. The first series in 1965 ended in a tie between Belgian town Ciney and French town St. Amand. A similar format followed in the longer 1966 series with more towns competing from each of the four nations.

The more familiar format began in 1967, when teams from Great Britain and Switzerland joined the competition and towns only appeared once in the series heats with each heat being hosted by one of the participant nations, culminating in a grand final. The quiz element was abandoned and the games became more comical (though none-the-less technically difficult), and began to be played in outlandish costumes (often large foam latex suits) with the contestants competing to complete bizarre tasks in funny games. The teams could not choose which of their members played each game. A draw was held to determine the game participants who were then allowed to rehearse the game once ahead of the broadcast recording. Each of the teams received a score for each game, which were umpired by one or two "international" judges (supported by referees from the participant countries), with the winner of each heat being awarded a silver trophy. The two judges/referees who became synonymous with the series were Swiss nationals Gennaro Olivieri and Guido Pancaldi, who were together on the show from 1966 to 1982. Pancaldi returned for the revived series in 1988.

Typically, the programmes were staged outdoors during the European summer months, although occasionally (such as the Dutch heat in 1971 staged at the Ahoy Sports Arena) the competition took place indoors. Historic market squares or the grounds of famous buildings were often used for the settings, although the surrounds of swimming pools or quay sides for lakes or the sea were very commonly used. The outdoor settings meant that bad weather could often have an impact on the competition, but the games took place regardless of hostile weather conditions. Infamously, a freak storm suddenly hit the 1970 Grand Final staged in the Verona Amphitheatre, leading to the unprotected audience having to flee from the torrential rain and the presenters being stranded without protection, but the show continued.

The series culminated in a grand final, with the most successful team for each nation from the series participating. Each finalist would qualify by winning their heat. If a country won more than one heat, the highest scoring winning team for that nation would go to the final. Any nation that had not won a heat would be represented by the highest scoring team that placed second. Occasionally, this meant that a team with a higher score, but had finished lower than second would be displaced by a lower scoring team who'd achieved a second place. In the rare event that none of the nation's teams had achieved a win or second place in any heat (such as GB 1967, France 1968 or Portugal 1979), then the highest scoring team regardless of place would participate in the final. Each participating country hosted one heat of the games, presented by the host broadcaster, with a rotation as to which of the nations hosted the grand final. The winner of the grand final would receive a gold trophy, with the runner up receiving silver and the third placed team bronze. It was not uncommon for nations to win the grand final with a team that had not won their heat or indeed for nations to win that had not won any heats at all. The Swiss won the grand final in both 1972 and 1974, the Germans in 1977, the Italians in 1978, the Portuguese in 1980 and the British in 1981 all with teams that had finished second in their heats and with none of their teams winning any heats at all. Portugal won the 1980 series trophy without ever having previously won any heats at all in either of their two series to date. The Swiss were twice series winners in 1972 and 1974 despite not winning a single heat in any series for four consecutive series from 1971 to 1974.

Only Belgium and Italy competed in the original series from start to finish (1965–1982). France participated in the 1968 series, but due to industrial action with French television, they were unable to broadcast any of the series domestically; also having to cancel hosting their designated heat. Germany hosted two heats that season in place of the French edition. With the strike action continuing, no French teams participated in the 1969 series at all. Liechtenstein participated in the series once, replacing the Swiss for the seventh and final heat in the 1976 series, designated as FL rather than CH for the episode. It had been agreed that should the team from Liechtenstein win their heat, they would be allowed to compete in the Grand Final alongside the best Swiss team. This proved immaterial when Liechtenstein finished fourth of the seven teams in the heat. A team from Derry represented Britain in the German heat of the 1978 series and were designated as NI rather than GB for that episode.

Dutch TV (who joined the competition for the 1970 series) became the first nation to permanently withdraw from the competition at the end of the 1977 series, having never won the series final. Flemish TV in Belgium carried all the series live, whereas Dutch TV recorded the episodes for later transmission (as did many others). Ratings were thus very low in the Netherlands as most viewers had already watched the show with Dutch commentary live from Flemish TV earlier. The Dutch were replaced in the series by Yugoslavia from 1978, who likewise, were never the series champions. Portugal joined in 1979, but Germany left the competition after the 1980 series due to falling ratings. It was agreed to end the contest before the commencement of the 1982 series, which ended with the first outright series win for original participant nation Belgium, but it was later revived with a different set of competing nations in 1988.

Some episodes started being produced and broadcast in colour beginning in 1968, but it wasn't until the 1970 series that the entire series was produced in colour. However, some broadcasters, notably the French and Italians, continued to broadcast the episodes domestically in monochrome for many years, despite producing their own episode in colour. French TV began showing the entire series in colour in 1974, followed by Italy in 1976.

Each heat was presented almost exclusively in the language of the host nation/broadcaster, necessitating commentators explaining and describing the games and state of play to their domestic audiences. This format made the episodes difficult to sell outside of the participants, offering few opportunities to recoup the programme costs from international sales (although the format itself was licensed to many countries). From the late 1970s the BBC was charged with packaging the episodes for international sale including the English/British commentary. This encouraged sales in English speaking nations leading to broadcasts around the world. In some cases, the BBC would add a pre-show introduction from host Stuart Hall and would often trim the show's length from the broadcast version. Some episodes were occasionally cut to one hour editions for international sale.

Points were given for each game based on the ranking of the teams. For example, if there were six teams playing the game, the winner would get six points, with five for the second etc. Each team had to miss one game per episode, but all teams always played the final game. A joker could be played once by each team, which doubled their score for that game. The 'Fil Rouge' round was played individually by each team and after the 1969 series, no joker could be played on that element, although prior to 1970 jokers could be played on the 'Fil Rouge' and until the end of the 1971 series, jokers could also be played on the final game. This meant there were more points available for that game and many countries thus saved their jokers for the final game. The rules were changed from 1972 onwards, forbidding jokers on the last game. Belgium hosted the first heat of the 1972 series, but saved their joker for the final game. When the team captain presented it to the referees at the final game's start, they were told it was not permissible and thus for this heat, Belgium were unable to play their joker at all; the only time any team's joker was not contested. The Belgian team of Spa were too far behind the leading teams for the bonus joker points to have had any impact on the heat winners. With the increase in the number of teams to eight from the 1979 series on, the joker system was changed. Teams had to win the game to get a bonus of six points if they played their joker, with four points for finishing second and two points for finishing third. If they failed to finish in the top three for the game, there were no bonus joker points earned. The 'Fil Rouge' format was changed in 1981 so that all teams competed together in four repetitions of the game, with different team members in each repetition. The teams retained their best score/time from each of the four repetitions to determine the points after the fourth repetition.

Judges

 Gennaro Olivieri (Swiss, 1965–1982)
 Guido Pancaldi (Swiss, 1966–1989)
 Mike Swann (1988–1989)
 Bernard Galley (1990–1991)
 Denis Pettiaux (1990–1999)
 Carlo Pegoraro (1996, 1998–1999)
 Arthur Ellis (1971–1982)
 Nenad Romano (1979–1982)
 Bernhard Galley (1990–1992) 
 Babis Ioanidis (1995–1999)
 Irini Kamperidiou (1994)
 Nikos Mperedimas (1993)
 Beertje van Beers (Dutch, 1997)
 Lehel Németh (Hungarian, 1993–1995, 1999)
 Orsolya Hovorka (Hungarian, 1996–1998)
 Lea Vodušek (Slovenian, 1996–1997, 1999)

Participating countries and wins
Between 1965 and 1999, 20 countries participated in 30 seasons of Jeux sans frontières (considering Czech Republic and Czechoslovakia as separate participants):

Table key
 Former – Former countries that have been dissolved.

Each country was assigned a unique colour which it used on its uniforms and equipment. In the original series which ended in 1982, the colours were: Belgium – Yellow; Germany – Light Blue; Great Britain – Red; Italy – Dark Blue; Yugoslavia – White. France were originally assigned Purple, but this changed to Green after 1976. Switzerland were assigned Light Brown, but during the 1979 series, they switched to Red and White combined, confusing their teams with the British participants, necessitating returning to Light Brown in subsequent years, but again, still dressed in red and white for certain heats. The Netherlands were assigned Orange, but when the nation left the series after 1977, the colour was reassigned to Portugal from 1979.

Winning cities 

The 1969 Grand Final ended in a tie between German team Wolfsburg and British team Shrewsbury, who both attained 32 points. Under the rules of the competition, Wolfsburg were declared the series winners as the team had scored higher in the Fil Rouge. However, the Wolfsburg team captain insisted that the trophy should be shared and the judges agreed to award both teams joint first place.

After the final game of the 1981 Grand Final was completed, it appeared GB team Dartmouth had won the series golden trophy. However, after an objection raised by the Portuguese, the referees reviewed the game and the French team were disqualified and placed last for the final game. This gained the Portuguese team of Lisbon an extra point, tying them for series winners with Dartmouth.

Finals results table

Winter version
A winter themed spin-off version of the show, usually broadcast during the Christmas period, was a single episode edition contested each year from 1973 until 1981. It was generally alternately staged in Cortina d'Ampezzo, Italy by Rai (1973, 1975, 1976, 1979) and Aviemore, Scotland by the BBC (1974, 1977, 1981). Switzerland hosted the 1978 edition in Villars and Belgium hosted the 1980 edition in Liege.

In the UK, the show was entitled It's a Christmas Knockout!, with the other competing nations naming it Zeskamp Speciaal, Giochi Sotto L'Albero, Jeux de Noël, Weihnachtsspiele and Nyårs Knockout.

The show was hosted around an indoor or outdoor ice-rink or on snowy ground. On more than one occasion, when snow failed to materialise for the recording, artificial snow or foam was used instead. The games would generally be played on ice-skates or skis. Mainly, only four nations participated in the winter edition: Great Britain, Belgium, Italy and the Netherlands (who continued to take part after leaving the main series) and they were joined by a fifth nation, Switzerland that participated in the 1977–1980 editions.

After Jeux Sans Frontieres ended following the 1982 Grand Final, a winter/Christmas edition was recorded featuring teams from Belgium, Great Britain, the Netherlands and Portugal, the latter hosting the event in Praia Dourada, with Belgium winning. A decision was taken not to air the broadcast as it was considered sub-standard, with only Belgian television eventually airing the programme on December 26, 1982. A final edition of the original winter/Christmas themed version was shown at Christmas 1983 in a direct competition between Great Britain and Sweden staged in Aviemore.

When Jeux Sans Frontieres was revived in 1988, the one-off winter edition also returned, variously entitled Jeux Sans Frontieres: Christmas Special, Jeux Sans Frontieres on Ice or Jeux Sans Frontieres in the Snow.

Revival attempts
In 2006, the EBU announced plans to relaunch the series in summer 2007, in collaboration with Mistral Production and Upside Television. Belgium, Croatia, Spain, Greece, Netherlands, Portugal, Slovenia and Italy were thought to be participating countries. However, due to financial setbacks, the plans were put on hold—originally for 12 months, but later they were abandoned altogether.

In December 2016, the EBU in strategic planning for 2017–2020 included a new format based on the show, called Eurovision Super Games, a new attempt to revisit the TV program last aired in 1999. Twelve countries had joined and were involved in the project, a competition between eight countries each represented by four athletes playing a series of mental and physical challenges. The audiences at home would have the possibility to elect the 2 athletes of their country to participate in the proposed challenge. However, due to the lack of financial guarantees, the EBU announced in June 2017 that it would not be created.

2019 revivals
A revival of the show was confirmed on 18 June 2019 at the annual France Télévisions press conference. The revival will be produced by Nagui and broadcast on France 2.

The Italian version aired on Canale 5 from 19 September 2019 to 24 October 2019, with Ilary Blasi and Alvin as hosts. According to Italian media reports this edition, retitled Eurogames and filmed at Cinecittà World in Rome, was devoted to lighted matches between the teams of Italy, Spain, Germany and Greece alongside newcomers Poland and Russia but did not use the format of the original show. In Spain, six episodes premiered on the streaming service Mitele Plus on 3 January 2020, with Lara Álvarez and Joaquín Prat as hosts.

In popular culture

 The show inspired Peter Gabriel's 1980 hit single, "Games Without Frontiers" (the direct English translation of the title), in which backing vocalist Kate Bush sings "jeux sans frontières" during breaks. The lyrics also refer to title of the BBC version of the show, It's a Knockout.
 The last album of the popular Macedonian pop singer Toše Proeski is named Games without borders (in Macedonian Cyrillic: Игри Без Граници).
 The Endeavour episode "Quartet" (series 5, episode 5) features a fictional 1968 Jeux sans frontières competition held in Oxford, broadcast by Southern Independent Television (rather than the BBC).
 The show was a major component of The Goodies episode, "The Goodies and the Beanstalk".
 In Peter Kay's Phoenix Nights, the company that supplies the club with many of the fruit machines (including a Das Boot version that only pays out in Deutsche Marks) and other assorted gaming paraphernalia is called Jeux Sans Frontières.
 In 1986, a video game was made, based on the show. It was released on the Commodore 64, the Amstrad CPC and the ZX Spectrum. Only get bad reviews.

See also
It's a Knockout
Telematch
Jeux sans frontières (1991–1992)

Notes

References

External links 

JSFnet Italy
JSFnet Great Britain
It's A Knockout & JSF website
JSFnet France

 
Eurovision events
Television game shows
1960s game shows
1970s game shows
1980s game shows
1990s game shows
2010s game shows
Television series revived after cancellation